Mannina Magalu is a 1973 Indian Kannada-language film, directed and produced by B. S. Ranga. The film stars Udaykumar, Jayanthi, Gangadhar, Aarathi, and Rajasree. The film has musical score by S. Rajeshwara Rao. The movie is based on a novel of same name by Krishnamoorthy Puranik.

Cast

Udaykumar
Jayanthi
Gangadhar
Aarathi
Rajasree
B. Ramadevi
Annapurnamma
Mysore Lakshmi
Saraswathi
Rukmini
Ku Raji
Baby Sumathi
R. Nagendra Rao
Balakrishna
Dinesh (Kannada actor)
B. M. Venkatesh
Belur Raghavendra Rao
Mahadevayya
H. Ramachandra Shastry
Bangalore Nagesh
Narayana Rao
Srikanth
Ku Chandrashekar

Soundtrack
The music was composed by Satyam.

References

External links
 
 

1974 films
1970s Kannada-language films
Films directed by B. S. Ranga